Sean McCann (born September 18, 1971) is a Canadian ice hockey coach and former defenceman who was an All-American for Harvard.

Career
McCann was a member of Ronn Tomassoni's first recruiting class at Harvard. He played a solid defensive game for the Crimson, helping the team to a decent record as a freshman. The team finished atop their conference standings in his sophomore and junior seasons while being one of the best defensive teams in the country. In 1993 Harvard returned to the NCAA Tournament for the first time since winning the championship in 1989 but were undone by a double overtime loss in the opening round.

For his senior season, McCann was named team captain and went on to produce a rather astounding career year. He more than quadrupled his previous years point total and more than quintupled his goal production. He led the team to its third consecutive first-place finish in ECAC Hockey and the programs' first conference championship in seven years. Harvard received the second eastern seed and a bye into the NCAA quarterfinals. The Crimson easily handled New Hampshire to make the Frozen Four but couldn't overcome eventual champion Lake Superior State, losing 2–3 in overtime. McCann was named an All-American for the year and was drafted first overall in the 1994 NHL Supplemental Draft, the final such draft held.

McCann continued his new-found production as a professional, playing well during the 94–95 season and then doubling his point production in year two at the top level of the minor leagues. Unfortunately, McCann never received an appearance at the NHL level despite producing on both good and bad teams in AAA hockey. After 6 seasons as a professional, McCann retired in 2001.

After a season away from the game, McCann returned as an assistant coach at his alma mater. He helped Harvard win two more conference titles and make four consecutive NCAA appearances (losing every game) during his 7-year stint behind the bench. In 2009 McCann left Harvard to become the head coach at Saint Sebastian's School, a highly regarded prep school. While there he instructed several future star players including Noah Hanifin and Danny O'Regan. He continued to serve as the leader for the program as of 2021.

He was inducted into the Harvard Athletic Hall of Fame in 2009.

Statistics

Regular season and playoffs

Awards and honours

References

External links

1971 births
AHCA Division I men's ice hockey All-Americans
Canadian ice hockey defencemen
Carolina Monarchs players
Cincinnati Cyclones players
Florida Panthers draft picks
Grand Rapids Griffins players
Harvard Crimson men's ice hockey players
Houston Aeros (1994–2013) players
Living people
Milwaukee Admirals players
National Hockey League supplemental draft picks
Orlando Solar Bears (IHL) players
Sportspeople from North York
Ice hockey people from Toronto
Springfield Falcons players
Syracuse Crunch players